The sport of football in the country of Liberia is run by the Liberia Football Association. The association administers the national football team, as well as the Premier League. Football is the most popular sport in the country and George Weah is the country's most prominent player.

Liberia stadiums

References